Soñadoras, is a Mexican telenovela produced and created by Emilio Larrosa with Rocio Taboada and Braulio Pedraza for Televisa in 1998.

Plot
The main character of this story is Fernanda, a psychologist who works in a rehabilitation center for substance abusers. Fernanda has recently suffered a terrible tragedy, the man she was soon to marry was murdered while trying to resist a hold-up. During the assault, her father received a bullet in the spine which left him paralyzed.

At the beginning of the story we realize that Eugenio de la Peña, an evil drug lord, is in love with Fernanda and is willing to go to any extreme to make her his wife. But Fernanda meets the handsome Jose Luis, a writer and a literature teacher who works at a local private high school. Jose Luis is honest and hard working, charming and full of life. However, he carries a dark secret from his past.

When Fernanda and José Luis fall in love, Eugenio gets extremely jealous, but when he decides to eliminate his rival, he discovers that his own daughter Jaqueline, is in love with José Luis. Jaqueline, on the other hand, is being wooed by Manuel, who despite his popularity, cannot call Jaqueline's attention.

One of Jaqueline's friends is Emilia, a romantic but realistic young girl whose dream is to become a dancer. Emilia's boyfriend is Gerardo, whom she adores. Gerardo is the lead singer in a rock band. But soon, a dancer and choreographer called Enrique enters Emilia's life and falls in love with her.

Another of Jaqueline's friends is Lucía, the wealthiest of the dreamers, but also the homeliest. Lucia will fall in love with Gerardo but will be courted by Beto "Roque-feller". The colorful Beto lives in the same projects as Julieta, who becomes Lucia's best friend.

Julieta is ashamed of being poor and is bulimic. She constantly lies to her classmates about being wealthy and often brags about trips to Europe, expensive clothes etc. even though it is false. She will meet Carlos, a rich but second-rate physician. She will try to use him to pull herself out of her poverty, but eventually ends the relationship.

Julieta falls for a new rich student named Ruben Barraisaba. In the beginning, he finds her annoying, but then they begin to date. Ruben begins to falls in love with Julieta, but finds out she's been lying about her "wealth", and makes the assumption that she's only with him for money, and he decides to end the relationship.

Later, Julieta begins to date Beto and they develop a relationship. Meanwhile, with the help of a new student, Ana, Lucia becomes beautiful and makes a vengeful decision to get back at Gerardo for dating her out of pity. In the end, Gerardo finds out that Lucia is Adriana and is infuriated with her. They eventually forgive each other and start dating again. and there is Also Lenny a young, full of life boxer who meets, Jaqueline, accidentally on the date of Enrique and Emilia,because Enrigue works out in the Same Gym as Lenny and they are gym partners. So Lenny falls in love Jaquie, but relationship does not exist too much, when Manuel Decides to go against Lenny, for the love of Jacqueline, so they become enemies. Lenny's father don Felipe gave him the name, of an Italian American Boxer, whom he adored when he was a young boxer. Lenny is hot headed and is also a hot tempered person, and also knows David "el Cubano" Eugenio de La Peña's evil Henchman, who turned his dear friend Sandro from a boxer to a drug-addict and he seeks David for bringing him to Justice.

Cast

Main cast 

Alejandra Ávalos as Fernanda Guzmán
Arturo Peniche as Don José Luis Dueñas
Ariel López Padilla as Enrique Bernal 
José Carlos Ruiz as Don Eugenio de la Peña, a drug lord and Jacqueline's father. Main villain
Arath de la Torre as Adalberto "Beto" Roque
Eduardo Verástegui as Manuel Jr.
Diego Schoening as Benjamín "El Terco"
Jan as Gerardo Rinalde
Julián Moreno as Leonard "Lenny" Paleta
Aracely Arámbula as Jacqueline de la Peña
Michelle Vieth as Lucía de la Macorra
Angélica Vale as Julieta Ruiz Castañeda
Laisha Wilkins as Emilia González

Supporting cast 

Alejandro Aragón as Dr. Carlos Muñoz
Gustavo Rojo as Don Alfredo Guzmán, Fernanda's father
Silvia Eugenia Derbez as Rosita Ruiz Castañeda
Mónica Dossetti as Vanessa
Antonio Miguel as Director
Alfonso Kaffiti
Theo Tapia as Don Manuel
Polo Ortín as Octavio Ruiz
Zoila Quiñones as Maité Castañeda de Ruiz
Lupita Lara as Viviana
Santiago Perez as Don Felipe Paleta
Mariana Karr as Nancy González
Rudy Casanova as David "El Cubano", Don Eugenio's henchman
Sergio DeFassio as Pedro Roque
Ramón Valdés as Rodolfo
Roberto Tello as Victorio
Dulce as Antonia de la Macorra

Extended cast 
Irán Castillo as Ana Linares
Kuno Becker as Rubén Berraizábal 
Mike Biaggio as Adolfo

Special participation 
Raymundo Capetillo as Horacio de la Macorra

References

External links 
 

1998 telenovelas
1998 Mexican television series debuts
1999 Mexican television series endings
Mexican telenovelas
Televisa telenovelas
Spanish-language telenovelas